MTV Austria was an Austrian free-to-air television channel, launched as a localised subfeed of MTV Germany for the Austrian market. MTV Austria featured local advertising and a weekly local show named Music & Style featuring music and special events from Austria. The channel often showed different music videos from its German counterpart, aiming at more rock-oriented music which is more popular in Austria.

MTV channels
Defunct television channels in Austria
Television channels and stations established in 2006
Television channels and stations disestablished in 2010